Han Tae Young (born 4 September 1979) is a Korean Greco-Roman wrestler. He was born in Seoul, South Korea. Han won gold medal at 2006 Asian Games in Doha. He also competed in 2008 Summer Olympics at Beijing.

References

Living people
1979 births
Olympic wrestlers of South Korea
Sport wrestlers from Seoul
Asian Games medalists in wrestling
Wrestlers at the 2006 Asian Games
South Korean male sport wrestlers
Asian Games gold medalists for South Korea

Medalists at the 2006 Asian Games
Wrestlers at the 2008 Summer Olympics
21st-century South Korean people